The National Flag Square is a large city square off Neftchiler Avenue in Bayil, Baku, Azerbaijan. The National Flag Square covers  overall. The square features the state symbols of Azerbaijan—the coat of arms and the anthem—and a map of the country.

History
The President of Azerbaijan Ilham Aliyev laid the foundation stone for the National Flag Square near the naval base in Baku's Bayil settlement on 30 December 2007. The project was developed by the US firm Trident Support and executed by Azerbaijan's Azenko company. The site was formerly occupied by hundreds of houses, with Human Rights Watch reporting that many of the residents were forcefully evicted, and often given just several hours notice before their homes were demolished. 

The National Flag Square was opened on 1 September 2010; president Aliyev attended the inauguration and raised the flag. The following day the flag was ripped by strong winds and had to be taken down for repairs. 

Baku Boulevard was extended to the National Flag Square and the Baku Crystal Hall for the Eurovision Song Contest 2012.

The flagpole was confirmed as the world's tallest flagpole by the Guinness Book of Records upon its inauguration on 9 November 2010, but was soon overtaken by the 165-metre Dushanbe Flagpole in Tajikistan on 24 May 2011. The flagpole in the square was the third tallest flagpole in the world.

In 2017, after repeated incidents of flags being ripped by the wind, along with public complaints about the noise caused by the flag's waving, pollution caused by winds originating from the Caspian Sea and several risk assessments related to the base of the mast that could bring down the giant structure onto nearby streets or buildings near, the Azerbaijani government decided to dismantle and remove the flagpole. Reports emerged in February 2022 of plans to erect a new, taller and more modern flagpole on the site, with the new structure having a more secure and reinforced base so that it can withstand the speed of winds coming from the Caspian Sea.

Gallery

See also
 Baku Boulevard
 Architecture in Baku
 Martyrs' Lane

References

External links

Speech of the President of Azerbaijan at the inaugurational ceremony
Azerbaijani National Flag Square. Opening Ceremony.

Squares in Baku
Architecture in Azerbaijan
National squares
Buildings and structures completed in 2007
Flagpoles
2007 establishments in Azerbaijan